The Lignon du Velay (literally Lignon of the Velay) is an  long river in the Ardèche and Haute-Loire departments, south-central France. Its source is near Chaudeyrolles. It flows generally north. It is a right tributary of the Loire, into which it flows at Pont de Lignon, a hamlet in Monistrol-sur-Loire.

Departments and communes along its course
This list is ordered from source to mouth: 
Haute-Loire: Chaudeyrolles, Saint-Front, Fay-sur-Lignon, Les Vastres, Mazet-Saint-Voy
Ardèche: Mars
Haute-Loire: Le Chambon-sur-Lignon, Saint-Jeures, Tence, Chenereilles, Lapte, Yssingeaux, Grazac, Les Villettes, Saint-Maurice-de-Lignon, Monistrol-sur-Loire

References

Rivers of France
Rivers of Auvergne-Rhône-Alpes
Rivers of Haute-Loire
Rivers of Ardèche